Hemisquilla australiensis is a species of mantis shrimp native to Australia and also found in New Zealand.

References

Stomatopoda
Crustaceans of Australia